Héloïse Guérin (born 26 August 1989) is a French model.

Career
Guerin has appeared in advertisements for Blugirl, a branch of the brand Blumarine, Sportmax, Black Fleece by Brooks Brothers, and United Colors of Benetton; she also appeared in the Victoria's Secret Pink Collegiate Winter campaign.  Her runway credits include Marc Jacobs, Philosophy di Alberta Ferretti, Christian Dior, Isaac Mizrahi, Jill Stuart, and Lacoste. Guerin appeared in the J.Crew catalog for Fall 2010, and in 2011 for Tommy Hilfiger.

She is currently signed with Women Management Paris and Select Model Management.

References

External links
 
 
 
 
 

French female models
Living people
1989 births